Andrus Paul (born 21 April 1975) is an Estonian luger. He competed in the men's singles event at the 1998 Winter Olympics.

References

External links
 

1975 births
Living people
Estonian male lugers
Olympic lugers of Estonia
Lugers at the 1998 Winter Olympics
People from Tõrva